James David Riggleman (born November 9, 1952) is an American former Major League Baseball (MLB) manager and bench coach who coached with several teams between 1989 and 2019. He is currently the manager for the Billings Mustangs of the independent Pioneer League.

During his playing career, Riggleman was an infielder and outfielder in the Los Angeles Dodgers and St. Louis Cardinals minor league systems from 1974 to 1981. After his playing career ended, he managed in the Cardinals and San Diego Padres minor league systems until 1992, when he became the Padres' manager. From 1992 to 2011 Riggleman managed the Padres, Chicago Cubs, Seattle Mariners, and Washington Nationals, and also served as a major league coach with the Dodgers, Mariners, and Nationals between his managerial stints. His most recent major league managerial job was with the Nationals, a post he resigned from on June 23, 2011. Subsequently, he was employed as a scout with the San Francisco Giants. In 2015 he became a coach with the Cincinnati Reds. On April 19, 2018, he became the Reds' interim manager after Bryan Price was fired.

Playing career
Riggleman attended Frostburg State University. In 1973 he played collegiate summer baseball with the Falmouth Commodores of the Cape Cod Baseball League and was named a league all-star. He was selected by the Los Angeles Dodgers in the 1974 MLB Draft, and was assigned to the double-A level Waterbury Dodgers, where he played third base and second base. During the 1976 season, Riggleman transferred to the St. Louis Cardinals, where he was assigned to the double-A Arkansas Travelers and played in both infield and outfield. His career peaked at the triple-A level, which he reached in the Cardinals organization in 1977 and 1979. Riggleman's playing career ended after the 1981 season at the age of 28.

Coaching and managing career

St. Louis Cardinals (1983–1990)
In 1983, Riggleman became manager of the St. Petersburg Cardinals, a class-A affiliate of the St. Louis Cardinals. He managed at the double-A level in the Cardinals organization—including with the Arkansas Travelers, the team which he spent most of his playing career with.

San Diego Padres (1992–1994)
Riggleman made his major league managerial debut with the Padres late in the  season—after already managing a full season with the triple-A Las Vegas Stars—due to the late season departure of Greg Riddoch, and was retained through the  season. He finished with a record of 112 wins and 179 losses.

Chicago Cubs (1995–1999)
In  he became manager of the Chicago Cubs. In , Riggleman's Cubs earned a wild card postseason appearance that ultimately resulted in a loss to the Atlanta Braves in the National League Division Series. Riggleman would manage the Cubs through the  season. He finished with a record of 374 wins and 419 losses.

Los Angeles Dodgers (2001–2004)

Seattle Mariners (2008)
Riggleman began the 2008 season as the bench coach for the Seattle Mariners under new manager John McLaren. He was promoted to interim manager upon McLaren's dismissal on June 19, 2008, but was not retained by the Mariners after the season ended. He finished with a record of 36 wins and 54 losses.

Washington Nationals (2009–2011)

Riggleman was named bench coach for the Washington Nationals for the  season, and was promoted to interim manager on July 12, 2009, following Manny Acta's midseason dismissal. Riggleman picked McLaren as his bench coach. Jim Riggleman hired Burton Rocks as his agent and he negotiated his managerial deal with the Washington Nationals in November 2009. Riggleman was unhappy that the team had yet to pick up his contract option for the 2012 season. He said he told team management before the game that he "wanted to have a conversation" about his contract before the team left for a series against the Chicago White Sox, but "they didn't want to do that", so he offered his resignation. "I'm 58, I'm too old to be disrespected", he said. He finished with a record of 140 wins and 172 losses.

Cincinnati Reds (2012–2018)
For the 2012 season, Riggleman managed the Cincinnati Reds AA minor league affiliate Pensacola Blue Wahoos, ending the season with a 68–70 record. On December 12, 2012, Riggleman was promoted to manage the Reds' Class AAA team, the Louisville Bats, in 2013. On January 6, 2014, the Reds announced that Riggleman would return as manager of the Bats in 2014. On November 10, 2014, the Reds announced that Riggleman would be their third base coach for the 2015 season replacing Steve Smith. On April 19, 2018, Riggleman was named interim manager after the firing of Bryan Price. He was not retained as the manager after the 2018 season.

New York Mets (2019)
Riggleman was named the bench coach of the New York Mets on November 26, 2018, and was not retained after the 2019 season ended.

Billings Mustangs (2022)
Riggleman was named the manager of the Billings Mustangs on February 9, 2022.

Managerial record

See also
 List of St. Louis Cardinals coaches

References

External links

   

1952 births
Living people
Arkansas Travelers players
Cleveland Indians coaches
Chicago Cubs managers
Cincinnati Reds coaches
Falmouth Commodores players
Frostburg State Bobcats baseball players
Las Vegas 51s managers
Los Angeles Dodgers coaches
Louisville Bats managers
Major League Baseball bench coaches
Major League Baseball first base coaches
Major League Baseball third base coaches
Minor league baseball coaches
New Orleans Pelicans (baseball) players
New York Mets coaches
People from Burlington County, New Jersey
St. Louis Cardinals coaches
San Diego Padres managers
Seattle Mariners coaches
Seattle Mariners managers
Springfield Redbirds players
Washington Nationals coaches
Washington Nationals managers
Waterbury Dodgers players